P. syriacus may refer to:
 Pelobates syriacus, the eastern spadefoot or Syrian spadefoot, a toad species native to Eastern Europe and Western Asia
 Pseudophoxinus syriacus, a fish species found only in Lebanon

See also